Acerentuloides is a genus of proturans in the family Acerentomidae, found in North America.

Species
 Acerentuloides americanus Ewing, 1921
 Acerentuloides bernardi Shrubovych Starý & D'Haese, 2017

References

Protura